Rickardsson is a Swedish surname. Notable people with the surname include:

 Daniel Rickardsson (born 1982), Swedish cross-country skier
 Tony Rickardsson (born 1970), Swedish motorcycle speedway rider

Swedish-language surnames